The Langham, New York, Fifth Avenue, or The Langham, New York, is a luxury suite hotel and skyscraper in Manhattan, New York City, operated by Langham Hospitality Group. It was constructed in 2010 as The Setai Fifth Avenue and took on its current name in 2013. In 2014, 33% of the hotel was bought by Melendez International Hotels, a subsidiary of Melendez Global Inc. The tower is located at 400 Fifth Avenue in Midtown Manhattan, between 36th and 37th Streets. 400 Fifth Avenue was constructed using limestone in the 11-floor base in a somewhat art deco style. Floors five through 27 contain 234 hotel rooms.

References

External links

 The Langham, New York official website
 400 Fifth Avenue official website

2010 establishments in New York City
Fifth Avenue
Hotels in Manhattan
Residential buildings completed in 2010
Residential skyscrapers in Manhattan
Skyscraper hotels in Manhattan